The Shadow Cabinet of Simon Bridges formed the official Opposition in the 52nd New Zealand Parliament. It comprised all members of the New Zealand National Party, which was the largest party not a member of the Government.

The Shadow Cabinet was established on 11 March 2018, two weeks after Simon Bridges' election as Leader of the Opposition. The portfolio allocations were amended six times as a number of National MPs either resigned during the term of Parliament or announced their intention not to contest the 2020 general election.

Following Bridges' defeat by Todd Muller in the May 2020 National Party leadership election and the formation of Muller's Shadow Cabinet, the Bridges Shadow Cabinet ceased to exist.

Formation 
Commentators noticed that the initial portfolio allocations and caucus rankings rewarded Bridges' rivals for the leadership. Former Justice Minister Amy Adams, who had placed second in the leadership election, was named Finance Spokesperson and was ranked third. Judith Collins, who finished third, was placed at fourth rank, and received the housing portfolio, which she had asked for. Previous aspirants to the leadership, Jonathan Coleman and Mark Mitchell were also ranked highly, in sixth and seventh position respectively. Bridges' allies Todd McClay and Jami-Lee Ross were placed fifth and eighth respectively. Ross was the highest-ranked National MP who did not serve as a minister in the Fifth National Government. Along with Bridges and deputy leader Paula Bennett, the front bench was completed by economic and regional development spokesperson Paul Goldsmith and education spokesperson Nikki Kaye. Melissa Lee and Sarah Dowie were the other two non-ministers to gain promotion to the top twenty.

Bridges had promised "generational change" on his ascension to the leadership. The front bench line up in particular was praised for including a high proportion of women MPs. Bridges and Bennett were, notably, the first National leadership team both to be of Māori descent. Bridges also placed several former ministers in lower positions than they had held under Bridges' predecessor, Bill English. Former senior minister Gerry Brownlee lost the foreign affairs portfolio to McClay, while former Finance Minister Steven Joyce resigned from Parliament when he was not offered the finance portfolio. Former Conservation Minister Maggie Barry (who had openly supported Amy Adams' leadership bid) and Customs Minister Nicky Wagner were also demoted. The twelve new MPs elected in the 2017 general election were listed last, alphabetically by surname. Whanau Ora spokesperson Jo Hayes was the lowest ranked returning MP.

Amendments 
Portfolio allocations were amended six times throughout Bridges' tenure as leader to accommodate the departures or planned retirements of members. The first change was made two weeks after the formation of the Shadow Cabinet, on 26 March, with the resignation of Jonathan Coleman. Coleman had been the spokesperson for health and sport and recreation, portfolios he had held ministerial warrants for in the previous government. Michael Woodhouse, a former hospital chief executive, gained health. Education spokesperson Nikki Kaye picked up sport and recreation. Woodhouse's portfolio of workplace relations and safety was added to the responsibilities of environment spokesperson Scott Simpson.

In October 2018, a series of events that involved the leaking of Bridges' travel expenses saw transport and infrastructure spokesperson Jami-Lee Ross stand down from his portfolios while undertaking personal leave (ostensibly for "deeply personal" health issues, although Ross would later claim that this was a false statement put out by Bridges and Bennett) before resigning from the National Party. Judith Collins and Paul Goldsmith picked up Ross's portfolios. The third resignation, in January 2019, was of former Attorney-General Chris Finlayson. His shadow Attorney General portfolio went to Amy Adams and a new drug reform portfolio, responding to the Government's decision to hold a referendum on legalising the sale, use, possession and production of cannabis in 2020, was assigned to Paula Bennett.

In June 2019, Adams and Wairarapa MP Alastair Scott announced they would not seek re-election to Parliament at the 2020 general election. Along with the retirement of list MP and Māori development spokesperson Nuk Korako in mid-May, this triggered a broad reshuffle. Paul Goldsmith received Adams' finance portfolio and became the third-ranked MP. Goldsmith's economic and regional development portfolios were split between Todd McClay and Chris Bishop, who was promoted to the second bench and also gained the transport portfolio. Jo Hayes was promoted to be spokesperson for Māori development and Treaty of Waitangi negotiations, but retained a low ranking. Tim Macindoe became Shadow Attorney-General and Gerry Brownlee returned as foreign affairs spokesperson.

Agriculture spokesperson Nathan Guy announced his intention to retire at the next election in July 2019. He was replaced by Bridges' eventual successor to the leadership, Todd Muller, whose climate change portfolio was passed to Simpson. The sixth and final reshuffle, in February 2020, featured minor redistributions of portfolios following announcements that Maggie Barry (on 5 November 2019), Nicky Wagner, Sarah Dowie and David Carter (all on 11 February 2020, although Carter had previously indicated his intentions on 17 October 2018) would retire at the next election.

List of spokespersons 
At the point of its disestablishment, the Bridges Shadow Cabinet consisted of the following spokespersons.

References

New Zealand National Party
Bridges, Simon
2018 establishments in New Zealand
2020 disestablishments in New Zealand